Bojan Rajkovic (born ) is a Serbian male volleyball player. He is part of the Serbia men's national volleyball team. On club level he plays for Partizan Beograd.

References

External links
 profile at FIVB.org

1991 births
Living people
Serbian men's volleyball players
Place of birth missing (living people)